Another 700 Miles is a live EP by 3 Doors Down released on November 11, 2003.  It was recorded live at a performance in Chicago, Illinois during the band's Away from the Sun tour.

The EP's name is derived from the lyrics of their song "I Feel You", which appears on their album Away from the Sun.

Track listing
All tracks written by Brad Arnold, Todd Harrell, Chris Henderson, and Matt Roberts, except where noted.
"Duck and Run"  – 4:35
"When I'm Gone" (Intro)  – 1:18
"When I'm Gone"  – 4:21
"Kryptonite"  – 4:14 (Arnold, Harrell, Roberts)
"Here Without You"  – 4:11
"It's Not Me"  – 3:47
"That Smell" (Lynyrd Skynyrd cover) – 6:01 (Allen Collins, Ronnie Van Zant)

Charts

Weekly charts

Year-end charts

References

2003 debut EPs
3 Doors Down albums
Live EPs
2003 live albums
Universal Records live albums
Universal Records EPs